Joseph Keith Carter (born October 17, 1976) is an American college athletics administrator, currently the Athletic Director for the Ole Miss Rebels of the Southeastern Conference. Carter played professional basketball for nine seasons, primarily in Italy.

Carter came to Ole Miss from Perryville High School in Perryville, Arkansas. He was a four-year starter for the Rebels from 1995 to 1999, earning second-team All-Southeastern Conference honors as a junior and first-team as a senior. Carter was also named an honorable mention All-American by the Associated Press in 1999. For his college career, Carter scored 1,682 points. Following his college career, Carter played professionally in several American leagues before settling into a successful career in Italy.

After his playing career, Carter joined the Ole Miss athletic department in 2009 and was named executive director of the school’s athletic foundation. Following Ross Bjork's resignation as athletic director, Carter was named to the post on an interim basis. The interim tag was removed on November 20, 2019.

References

External links
Ole Miss athletic bio
College stats @ basketball-reference.com
RealGM.com profile

1976 births
Living people
American expatriate basketball people in Italy
American men's basketball players
Basketball players from Arkansas
Basket Napoli players
Competitors at the 1998 Goodwill Games
Dakota Wizards (CBA) players
Goodwill Games medalists in basketball
New Mexico Slam players
Ole Miss Rebels athletic directors
Ole Miss Rebels men's basketball players
Orlandina Basket players
Pallacanestro Varese players
People from Perry County, Arkansas
Shooting guards
Teramo Basket players
Veroli Basket players